The Faculty of Arts is one of six faculties at the University of Waterloo in Waterloo, Ontario, Canada.

Departments
The faculty presently houses sixteen academic departments, the School of Accounting and Finance and the Stratford School of Interaction Design and Business.

Academic Departments:
Anthropology, Classical Studies, Drama and Speech Communication, Economics, English Language and Literature, Fine Arts, French Studies, Germanic and Slavic Studies, History, Independent Studies, Philosophy, Political Science, Psychology, Religious Studies, Social Development Studies, Sociology, Spanish and Latin American Studies.

The Faculty of Arts offers seven undergraduate entry programs, over thirty majors and more than 400 degree options.

The University of Waterloo, along with University of Guelph and Wilfrid Laurier University is a member of the Tri-University Graduate History Program, which combines the history departments of the three universities at the graduate level. Graduate students are registered at one of the three universities according to their supervisor, but can take courses at any of the campuses. This allows the group to have more diverse course offerings more efficiently.

Research

Research centres
The Faculty of Arts is home to seventeen research centres, including:
 The Centre for Accounting Research and Education (CARE),
 Canadian Centre of Arts and Technology (CCAT),
 The Canadian Language & Literacy Research Network,
 The UW Centre for Child Studies,
 The Canadian Centre for Cultural Innovation (CCCI),
 The Centre for Cultural Management (CCM),
 The Early Childhood Education Centre (ECEC),
 The Centre for Election Studies,
 The Centre for Advanced Studies in Finance,
 The Centre on Foreign Policy and Federalism (CFPF),
 The Centre for Learning and Teaching Through Technology (LT3),
 The Southwestern Ontario Research Data Centre (SWORDC),
 The Survey Research Centre (SRC),
 Synaesthesia Research Centre,
 The UW Centre for Mental Health Research
 The Waterloo Centre for German Studies (WCGS),
 Waterloo Decision Research (WDR).

Endowed chairs
In 2007, the Department of German and Slavic Studies was granted funding for a "Right Honourable John G. Diefenbaker Memorial Chair in German Literary Studies."
Since 2009, the Department of Philosophy has hosted the "Wolfe Chair in Science and Technology Studies" as well as the "Waterloo Chair in Science and Society."
The Department of Philosophy also provides an endowed visiting professorship, the "Humphrey Professorship in Feminist Philosophy".
The Department of Jewish studies is home to the "Joe and Wolfe Lebovic Chair in Jewish Studies".

Student societies
Students in the Faculty of Arts are represented by the Arts Student Union (ASU) which has many roles including hosting social events, management of a student tuck shop, and representing student interests on various boards within and outside of the Faculty. Additionally, all students pay into the Arts Endowment Fund which funds improvements to equipment and supplies for students.

Within ASU there are 27 societies representing programs in the Faculty.

References

External links
Faculty of Arts website

Faculty of Arts
Educational institutions established in 1960
1960 establishments in Ontario